Clubul Sportiv Blejoi, commonly known as CS Blejoi, is a Romanian professional football club from Blejoi, Prahova County, Romania. The club was founded in 2008 and currently is playing in the Liga III.

Honours
Liga IV – Prahova County
Winners (2): 2017–18, 2018–19
Runners-up (4): 2011–12, 2014–15, 2015–16, 2016–17
Cupa României – Prahova County
Winners (1): 2018–19

Players

First-team squad

Out on loan

Club officials

Board of directors

Current technical staff

League history

References

External links
 AJF Prahova club profile

Football clubs in Prahova County
Association football clubs established in 2008
Liga III clubs
Liga IV clubs
2008 establishments in Romania